Atike Sultan ("the free one" or "the generous one"; 29 February 1712 – 2 April 1737) was an Ottoman princess, the daughter of Sultan Ahmed III. She was half-sister of Mustafa III and Abdul Hamid I.

Life

Birth
Atike Sultan was born on February in the Topkapı Palace. Her father was Sultan Ahmed III.

Marriage
On 6 January 1724, her father betrothed her to Mehmed Pasha, the son of Grand vizier Nevşehirli Damat Ibrahim Pasha and his first wife (his second wife was the Atike's half-sister, Fatma Sultan). On 21 February 1724 the betrothal gifts presented by Mehmed Pasha were transported from the palace of the grand vezir to the Imperial Palace, and the marriage contract was concluded the same day. In same day, also her half-sisters Ümmügülsüm Sultan and Hatice Sultan married. Ten days later, on 13 March, Atike's trousseau, and on 16 March Atike Sultan herself were transported from the Topkapı Palace to her palace at Cağaloğlu Palace, located on the Divanyolu street. By her marriage she had a son.

Charity
In 1728–29, Atike's father commissioned a fountain in Üsküdar in her name.

Death
Atike Sultan died on 2 April 1737 in the Çağaloğlu Palace, and was buried in New Mosque, Istanbul.

Ancestry

References

Sources

1712 births
1738 deaths
Royalty from Istanbul
18th-century Ottoman princesses